The Western Duars are part of the Duars region of eastern West Bengal, India. The region comes under the Jalpaiguri district. The Western Dwars were created in 1865. It was merged with the Jalpaiguri in 1869.

References
Jalpaiguri district web site

1865 establishments in India
Regions of West Bengal